The Utah Tech Trailblazers football team, formerly known as the Dixie State Trailblazers, represent Utah Tech University in the sport of American football. The Trailblazers compete as a member of the Western Athletic Conference at the NCAA Division I Football Championship Subdivision (FCS) level in the  National Collegiate Athletic Association (NCAA). Originally a junior college program, the school joined the NCAA at the Division II level in 2006 and played in the Great Northwest Athletic Conference from 2008 through 2016 and the Rocky Mountain Athletic Conference for the 2017, 2018, and 2019 seasons. In July 2020, they began the transition to NCAA Division I status by moving to the Western Athletic Conference (WAC) in all sports except football.

In July 2021, the WAC reinstated football as a sponsored sport, playing at the FCS level. This coincided with the arrival of four new members that play FCS football; with Southern Utah University set to join in 2022. After the 2022 season, the WAC fully merged its football league with that of the ASUN Conference, creating the ASUN–WAC Football Conference, and Utah Tech accordingly moved its football team to the new league. However, Utah Tech is ineligible for FCS Playoff competition until 2024 due to NCAA transfer rules.

Future non-conference opponents 
Announced schedules as of November 28, 2022.

Footnotes

References

External links
 

 
American football teams established in 2006
2006 establishments in Utah